The Temple of the Moon is an Incan ceremonial temple on Huayna Picchu near Machu Picchu, in Peru. The site is made up of stone masonry and an open-face, shallow cave. The temple is arbitrarily named, like many of the sites in Machu Picchu.

In the center of the cave is a throne carved out of rock. Beside the throne are steps that lead deeper into the cave. It is thought that the caves were used to hold mummies. The Temple of the Moon dates back 1500 years. It was rediscovered in 1936.

Architecture

The Temple of the Moon consists of three structural components: an overhanging cave with superb stonework, a very tall double-jamb doorway beyond, and farther beyond, several structures including one that again uses a cave. The stone work in the Temple is said to contain the three planes of the Incan religion to be depicted: the Hanan Pacha (the heavens, or world of above), the Kay Pacha (the earth, or physical life), and the Ukju Pacha (the underworld, or world of below), represented respectively by the condor, the puma, and the snake. The temple also boasts niches and fake doors inserted in the stones, with an enormous  by  entrance. The premises are rectangular with the rocks of the mountains as walls. Its three doors are 1.60 meters high (in the front) and 1.00 m high (at the sides). Inside, there are six trapezoidal niches. The "temple", strictly speaking, consists of a major platform supporting a building which is raised 5 meters above the ground, with an  entrance. Huaca de la Luna (Temple of the Moon), contains 6 levels, built on top of the other during a 200-year span, according to Eyewitness travel guide.

Name
Most scientists and authors believe that the name of the Temple is arbitrary, as many other names given to sites in Machu Picchu. Guidebook writers Ruth M Wright and Alfredo Valencia Zegarra say that they have found no indication that the lunar ritual played any part in the use of this shrine.
Some have speculated that the temple gets its name from the way moonlight radiates inside the cave at night.

Purpose
The purpose of building of the Temple is not exactly known. Scientists have long known and documented that people lived in caves.  Keeping in mind that caves, like springs, were thought to be entrances for gods, they believe the Temple's purpose was to be a place of worship to the Gods.

There is a theory that it must have been a royal tomb, place of worship and look-out post. Some believe that this was a place for sacrifices, because the structure has beautiful vaulted niches and empty trapezoids of typical Inca type and in front of the cavern, there is a rock sculpted in the shape of an altar. Others think Temple of the Moon was a ceremonial bathing complex.

Access
The trail that leads from the summit of Huayna Picchu to the Temple and the Great Cave is very exposed and can be quite slippery.  A few spots have a steel handrail cable (a via ferrata), but a fall in many places would have severe results.  The trail that leads off from the main Huayna Picchu trail near the saddle is easier and safer, but still presents hazards.  Expect at least a 45-minute walk in each direction from this lower trail, and at least an hour from the summit down the alternate trail to the ruins, plus the 45-minute walk back uphill and to the main trail.

See also
Inca trail
Cusco Region

References

External links
 Huayna Picchu , Incan Trail Info
 Huayna Picchu and Temple of the Moon Picture
 Attractions in Machu Picchu : Wayna Picchu , Inti Punku , Gate of The Sun , Mandor
 Machu Picchu Architecture
 Temple of the Moon - Ruin Trips & Tours by Viva Travel Guides

Archaeological sites in Peru
Inca
Ruins in Peru
Archaeological sites in Cusco Region
Tourist attractions in Cusco Region
Religious buildings and structures in Peru
Inca